Tommy Bertheussen (born 23 February 1973) is a retired Norwegian football goalkeeper.

He hails from Tromsø and started his youth career in IF Skarp, until he moved to Tromsdalen in his late childhood and joined Tromsdalen UIL. He went on to play senior football for Tromsdalen UIL, except for a spell when he studied at Bodø University College and played for FK Gevir Bodø. He is known for his red hair and Irish heritage. He also swears a lot, which has caused several disputes among both friends, newspapers and politicians, most notably the 40-year meltdown episode. In 2003, he was signed by first-tier club Tromsø IL, appearing in three games in the 2003 Tippeligaen. He retired following that season.

References

1973 births
Living people
Sportspeople from Tromsø
Norwegian footballers
Tromsdalen UIL players
Tromsø IL players
Eliteserien players
University of Nordland alumni
Association football goalkeepers